Elizabeth Ann Fletcher (née Pannill; born February 13, 1975) is an American attorney and politician from Texas. A Democrat, she represents  in the United States House of Representatives. The district includes much of western Houston.

Early life and education 
Fletcher was born at Hermann Hospital in Houston on February 13, 1975. She grew up in the River Oaks neighborhood of Houston and graduated from St. John's School.

Fletcher left Texas to attend Kenyon College in Ohio, where she earned Phi Beta Kappa honors, and attended William & Mary Law School in Virginia.

She returned to Houston, where she worked for the law firm Vinson & Elkins. Later, she worked at Ahmad, Zavitsanos, Anaipakos, Alavi & Mensing, where she met her husband, Scott, and became the firm's first female law partner.

U.S. House of Representatives

Elections

2018 

Fletcher defeated Laura Moser in the Democratic Party primary election after a primary and runoff election that sharply divided Democrats between Fletcher (backed by the Democratic Congressional Campaign Committee) and Moser (backed by Our Revolution).

In the November 6 general election, Fletcher campaigned as a moderate against nine-term Republican incumbent John Culberson, defeating him by five percentage points (52.5% to 47.5%). Culberson carried his longstanding base of west Houston, parts of which he had represented for three decades at the state and federal levels, and the Memorial area, but could not overcome Fletcher's strong performance in the district's share of southwest Houston and the Bear Creek area.

Upon her swearing-in on January 3, 2019, Fletcher became the first Democrat and woman to represent the district since its creation in 1967.

2020 

Fletcher was reelected with 50.8% of the vote to Republican nominee Wesley Hunt's 47.5%. Despite winning by a smaller margin than 2018, she held down-ballot drop-off voting to less than 4% from top-ballot candidate Joe Biden, who carried the district with 54% of the vote.

Tenure

As of September 2021, Fletcher had voted in line with Joe Biden's stated position 100% of the time.

In 2022, Fletcher was one of 16 Democrats to vote against the Merger Filing Fee Modernization Act of 2022, an antitrust package that would crack down on corporations for anti-competitive behavior.

Committee assignments 
Committee on Energy and Commerce
Subcommittee on Health
Subcommittee on Communications and Technology
Subcommittee on Consumer Protection and Commerce
Committee on Science, Space, and Technology
Subcommittee on Environment

Caucus memberships 
New Democrat Coalition
Task Force on Trade (co-chair)
Health Care Task Force
 Natural Gas Caucus (co-chair)
 Anti-Semitism Caucus
Congressional Asian Pacific American Caucus
Black Maternal Health Caucus
Diabetes Caucus
Congressional LGBT Equality Caucus
Gun Violence Prevention Task Force
National Corrosion Caucus
Oil and Gas Caucus
Pro-Choice Caucus
Small Brewers Caucus
Congressional Sportsmen's Foundation
U.S.-Japan Caucus

Electoral history

Personal life
Fletcher is the sister of Katherine Center. She met her husband, Scott, at the law firm where they both worked.

Fletcher is a Methodist.

See also
Women in the United States House of Representatives

References

External links

 Congresswoman Lizzie Pannill Fletcher official U.S. House website
 Campaign website

|-

1975 births
21st-century American politicians
American Methodists
Candidates in the 2018 United States elections
Democratic Party members of the United States House of Representatives from Texas
Female members of the United States House of Representatives
Kenyon College alumni
Living people
Methodists from Texas
Protestants from Texas
William & Mary Law School alumni
Women in Texas politics
St. John's School (Texas) alumni
21st-century American women politicians